Boseman is a surname. Notable people with the name include:

 Benjamin A. Boseman (1840–1881), American doctor and legislator in South Carolina
 Chadwick Boseman (1976–2020), American actor and screenwriter
 George Boseman, American actor, comedian and screenplay writer
 Julia Boseman, American politician

See also
Bozeman (surname)